Gane is an Austronesian language of southern Halmahera, Indonesia, spoken by the Gane people. There are estimated to be roughly 5200 native speakers of the language. It is closely related to the Taba language.

References

South Halmahera–West New Guinea languages
Languages of Indonesia
Halmahera